Gustavo Molina (born February 24, 1982) is a Venezuelan former professional baseball catcher. He played in Major League Baseball for the Chicago White Sox, Baltimore Orioles, New York Mets, Boston Red Sox, and New York Yankees from 2007 to 2011.

Career

Chicago White Sox
Molina was originally signed as an undrafted free agent by the Chicago White Sox on January 3, 2000. He spent seven years in the minor leagues with the White Sox organization before making his major league debut on April 2, with the White Sox. He was on the White Sox' opening day roster due to backup catcher Toby Hall being placed on the disabled list. During Molina's short one-and-a-half month tenure with the White Sox, he went 1–18 with one RBI. He got his first hit against the New York Yankees at U.S. Cellular Field. Shortly after, once Hall returned, he was sent down to the minors.

Baltimore Orioles
On July 30, 2007, Molina was claimed off waivers by the Baltimore Orioles, who immediately sent him to play with the Bowie Baysox, the Orioles' Double-A team.

New York Mets
In December 2007, Molina signed a minor league contract with the New York Mets and became a free agent at the end of the season.

Washington Nationals
On December 23, 2008, he signed a minor league contract with the Washington Nationals.

Boston Red Sox
On January 29, 2010 the Boston Red Sox signed Molina to a minor league contract. On June 29, 2010, he was purchased to replace Víctor Martínez, who was placed on the DL. On July 18, he was designated for assignment. Molina was one of six catchers Boston used during the 2010 season.

New York Yankees
Molina signed a minor league contract with an invitation to spring training with the New York Yankees for the 2011 season. He made six plate appearances for the Yankees, recording one hit before being optioned back to Triple-A. For the Scranton/Wilkes-Barre Yankees, Molina recorded a .239 batting average, two home runs and 17 runs batted in. He was designated for assignment on August 19, and returned to the minors. For the 2012 season, Molina re-signed with the Yankees organization, and opened the season with their AA Eastern League affiliate in Trenton.

Southern Maryland Blue Crabs
He became a free agent from the Southern Maryland Blue Crabs after the 2016 season.

Bridgeport Bluefish
On June 29, 2017, Molina signed with the Bridgeport Bluefish of the Atlantic League of Professional Baseball. He became a free agent on November 1, 2017 when the Bridgeport Bluefish folded.

See also
 List of Major League Baseball players from Venezuela

References

External links

Pelota Binaria (Venezuelan Winter League)
TSN News

1982 births
Living people
Águilas Cibaeñas players
Venezuelan expatriate baseball players in the Dominican Republic
Arizona League White Sox players
Baltimore Orioles players
Birmingham Barons players
Boston Red Sox players
Bowie Baysox players
Bridgeport Bluefish players
Bristol White Sox players
Cardenales de Lara players
Caribes de Anzoátegui players
Charlotte Knights players
Chicago White Sox players
Kannapolis Intimidators players
Lancaster Barnstormers players
Major League Baseball catchers
Major League Baseball players from Venezuela
Navegantes del Magallanes players
New Orleans Zephyrs players
New York Mets players
New York Yankees players
Pawtucket Red Sox players
People from La Guaira
Scranton/Wilkes-Barre Yankees players
Southern Maryland Blue Crabs players
Syracuse Chiefs players
Tigres de Aragua players
Trenton Thunder players
Venezuelan expatriate baseball players in the United States
Winston-Salem Warthogs players
Rimini Baseball Club players
Venezuelan expatriate baseball players in Italy
20th-century Venezuelan people
21st-century Venezuelan people